Pacific island nations and associated states make up the top seven on a 2007 list of heaviest countries, and eight of the top ten. In all these cases, more than 70% of citizens age 15 and over are obese. A mitigating argument is that the BMI measures used to appraise obesity in Caucasian bodies may need to be adjusted for appraising obesity in Polynesian bodies, which typically have larger bone and muscle mass than Caucasian bodies; however, this would not account for the drastically higher rates of cardiovascular disease and type 2 diabetes among these same islanders.

Overweight populations

Obese populations

Nations

Nauru 

Obesity is seen as a sign of wealth in Nauru. 31% of Nauruans are diabetic. This rate is as high as 45% among the 55–64-year-old age group .

Tonga 
Life expectancy has fallen to 64 in Tonga. Tongan life expectancy used to be in the mid-70s. Up to 40% of the population is said to have type 2 diabetes.

Fiji 
In Fiji, strokes used to be rare in people under 70. Now, doctors report that they have become common amongst patients in their 20s and 30s. Research done on globalization's impact on health indicates that the rise in average BMI in Fiji correlates with the increase in imports of processed food. Dr Temo K Waqanivalu, a Fijian representative for WHO, attributes health problems in his country to the replacement of traditional foods by more glamorous imported foods.

Marshall Islands 
In the Marshall Islands in 2008, there were 2000 cases of diabetes out of a population of 53,000. Diabetes prevalence in adults in the Marshall Islands in 2011 was 21.8%. A survey done in the Marshall Islands revealed that the percentage of the total population considered overweight or obese was 62.5%.

Cook Islands 
The Cook Islands comprises fifteen small islands and has a local population of about 10,000 people. In the Cook Islands, meals and feasts exemplify a level of community. Food habits play a role in maintaining social status and hierarchy.

Samoa  

The arrival of fast food restaurants and other contemporary food items on the islands are one of the issues responsible for the obesity in Samoa. The earliest photographs of Samoans provide visual proof of the native population's natural physique before the introduction of processed foods by Western society. The natural lifestyle of physically labouring to provide for natural foods and building shelters and communities gave way to modern conveniences like drive through restaurants, motorised vehicles, air travel, wireless communications, and pharmaceutical and recreational drugs. The development of modern society, although advanced with technologies, has also made it easy for many to live an unhealthy lifestyle, therefore leading to obesity.

Causes

Colonial history and social change 
In the early twentieth century, external people visiting the islands such as missionaries and colonial visitors to the Pacific Islands influenced local food habits. In the 1910s, European colonial powers introduced a number of foods to the Nauruans to mitigate impacts of drought and famine and add variety to the Nauruan diet. In the 1920s, the wife of one missionary taught Nauruans to fry fish in a pan rather than eat it raw. Over time, such changes led to skill loss (in fishing and food preservation) and dependence on foreign foods.

A relatively sedentary lifestyle, including among children, is also contributing to rising obesity rates.

Cultural standards and practices 
Obesity in the Pacific Islands is also thought to be influenced by social and cultural factors (tambu foods), including past poor public education on diet, exercise and health Micronutrient deficiencies are also common.) Feasting and festivals are major parts of life, imported foods have been given higher social status than local, healthier foods, and historically a large body size was associated with wealth, power and beauty. The Nauru term for satisfaction and feeling healthy, pweda, is the same as fullness or distention.

High rates of obesity appear within 15 months of birth.

Nutrient transmission 
Nutrient transmission (change in diet) is the primary cause of the obesity epidemic in the Pacific Islands, with a high amount of imported foods high in salt and fat content grow. Much of the local diet as of at least 2008 consists of processed, salty and calorie-dense imported food such as spam or corned beef, rather than traditional fresh fish, fruit and vegetables. Some foods high in saturated fat such as mutton flaps and turkey tails are sold in the Pacific islands due to relatively low wealth.

Results

Obesity is leading to increased levels of illness, including type 2 diabetes and heart diseases and other associated noncommunicable diseases. Maternal obesity has been associated with preterm birth in Palau.

A trend of childhood overweight and obesity rates is on the rise. In 2016, the highest rates of obesity for girls (over 30%) were in Nauru and for boys in the Cook Islands.

Efforts to treat obesity 
The World Health Organization implemented various fiscal policies to fight the rise of childhood obesity. Policies include (1) taxation of sugar sweetened beverages (20% SSB Tax) (2) New Marketing on Unhealthy Foods and Beverages to Children (3) International Code of Marketing on Breast Milk Substitutes. Different nations implemented these WHO recommendations to a different extent.

However, such existing public health programs based on nutrition and exercise, solely focusing on the domain of health, have achieved little success. Histories of social values surrounding food and health is often overlooked, and may explain why food habits are hard to change through public health programs.

See also
 List of countries by Body Mass Index (BMI) 
 Genetics of obesity
 New World Syndrome
 Epidemiology of obesity

References

 
Health in Tonga
Health in the Federated States of Micronesia
Health in Nauru
Health in Samoa